John R. McConnell (1826–1879) was the fourth attorney general of California from 1854 to 1856.  He ran in 1861 for Governor of California under the Southern Democratic party, but he lost to Leland Stanford.

McConnell was born in Kentucky. He died in Denver, Colorado.

References
 
  Brief history and picture

1826 births
1879 deaths
California Attorneys General
19th-century American politicians
California Democrats